Stanley Arthur Franklin (30 October 1930 – 2 February 2004) was a British political cartoonist whose career on the Daily Mirror and The Sun newspapers covered almost forty years.

Stanley (Stan) Franklin, born at Bow in the East End of London, was the son of coppersmith Harry Franklin. He left school at 14, and later attended Hammersmith School of Arts and Crafts where he produced his first cartoon published in Fleet Street, and took classes in lithography at The Working Men's College, Camden. He admired work of the Daily Mirror's Philip Zec which inspired him to become a political cartoonist. However, he failed to gain employment at the Evening Standard, and joined an advertising agency.

First employed as cartoonist with the Daily Herald in 1954, he moved on to the Daily Mirror in 1959, succeeding ‘Vicky’ (Victor Weisz). He stayed at the Mirror until 1970, moved to The Sun in 1974, and worked with that paper until 1998. His work included many cartoons of leading politicians and aristocracy, including several prime ministers, and Prince Philip who collected Franklin's sketches of the Royal Family.

As a free-lance cartoonist he produced work for the New Statesman and for illustrated books:  Alf Garnett's Little Blue Book (1973),  The Thoughts of Chairman Alf (1973), Alf Garnett Scripts (1973), and Dick Emery's In Character (1973). He was a founder member of the Cartoonists' Association, formed in 1966, and was a member of the Fleets Street's old Press Club and a guarantor of the London Press Club.

Franklin died at Kingston-upon-Thames in 2004.

References

External links
Biography at the British Cartoon Archive
Obituary at TheFreeLibrary.com
 Cartoon by Franklin of (Alfred) Ernest Marples, 1st Baron Marples and Richard Beeching, 1st Baron Beeching in the collection of the National Portrait Gallery, London

English cartoonists
1930 births
2004 deaths